Cyrto-hypnum is a genus of mosses belonging to the family Thuidiaceae.

Species
Species as accepted by GBIF;

References

Hypnales
Moss genera